Donald Martin Honig (born 1931 in New York City) is a novelist, historian and editor who mostly writes about baseball.

While a member of the Bobo Newsom Memorial Society, an informal group of writers, Honig attempted to convince Lawrence Ritter to write a sequel to his 1966 book The Glory of their Times.

Pleading time limitations, Ritter declined to attempt such a book himself, but gave Honig his blessing, leading to the books Baseball When the Grass Was Real (1975) and Baseball Between The Lines (1976).

Over the next 19 years, Honing churned out 39 books about baseball. He collaborated with Ritter on The 100 Greatest Baseball Players of All Time in 1981.

He also published several illustrated histories of long-standing franchises. Honig published his most recent baseball book, The Fifth Season, in 2009.

Honig was also a frequent contributor of short stories to Alfred Hitchcock's Mystery Magazine. He resides in Cromwell, Connecticut.

Bibliography
 Man with a Problem (1958)
  The Journal of One Davey Wyatt  (1971)
 Johnny Lee (1971)
 An End of Innocence (1972)
 The Severith Style (1972)
 Way to Go, Teddy (1973)
 Illusions (1974)
 Coming Back (1974)
 Fury on Skates (1974)
 Baseball When the Grass Was Real (1975)
 Baseball Between the Lines (1976)
 Winter Always Comes (1977)
 The Last Great Season (1979)
 Marching Home (1980)
 The Brooklyn Dodgers: An Illustrated Tribute (1981)
 The 100 Greatest Baseball Players of All Time (1981)
 Baseball's Ten Greatest Teams (1982)
 The Los Angeles Dodgers: The First Quarter Century (1983)
 The American League: An Illustrated History (1983)
 The National League: An Illustrated History (1983)
 The Boston Red Sox: An Illustrated Tribute (1984)
 Baseball America (1985)
 Dodgers: The Complete Record of Dodgers Baseball (1986)
 The World Series: An Illustrated History from 1903 to the Present (1986)
 The All-Star Game: A Pictorial History, 1933 to Present (1987)
 Mays, Mantle, Snider: A Celebration (1987)
 The Greatest First Basemen of All Time (1988)
 The Donald Honig Reader (1988)
 The Plot to Kill Jackie Robinson (1992)
 The October Heroes: Great World Series Games Remembered by the Men Who Played Them (1996)
 The Sword of General Englund: A Novel of Murder in the Dakota Territory, 1876 (1996)
 Classic Baseball Photographs, 1869-1947 (1999)
 The Fifth Season: Tales of My Life in Baseball (1999)

As editor
 The Man in the Dugout: Fifteen Big League Managers Speak Their Minds (1977)

References

1931 births
Living people
20th-century American novelists
Baseball writers
Sportswriters from New York (state)
People from Cromwell, Connecticut
20th-century American non-fiction writers